She Couldn't Say No is a 1940 American comedy film directed by William Clemens and written by Earl Baldwin and Charles Grayson. The film stars Roger Pryor, Eve Arden, Cliff Edwards, Clem Bevans, Vera Lewis and Irving Bacon. It was released by Warner Bros. on December 7, 1940.

Plot

Wally Turnbull is a partner in a law firm, Trumbull and Johnson, where his trusty secretary Alice Hinsdale is so much in love with Wally that she put aside her own ambitions of becoming an attorney.

Wally is offered a chance to represent a wealthy old man, Eli Potter, in a business transaction. It turns out Potter is being sued for breach of promise by a lady, Pansy Hawkins, who needs a good lawyer. After being shot at by Potter, Wally decides to become Patsy's lawyer instead. Not knowing Patsy has already become Wally's client, Alice pretends to be his partner Johnson and agrees to represent Potter. So angry is Wally that an irritated Alice goes through with the trial, opposing him in court. Potter's reconciliation with Pansy makes the outcome moot.

Cast   
 Roger Pryor as Wallace Turnbull
 Eve Arden as Alice Hinsdale
 Cliff Edwards as Banjo Page
 Clem Bevans as Eli Potter
 Vera Lewis as Pansy Hawkins
 Irving Bacon as Abner
 Spencer Charters as Hank Woodcock
 Ferris Taylor as Judge Jenkins
 Chester Clute as Ezra Pine
 George Irving as Henry Rockwell
 Zeffie Tilbury as Ma Hawkins
 George Guhl as Barber
 Frank Mayo as Town Marshal

References

External links 
 
 
 
 

1940 films
Warner Bros. films
American comedy films
1940 comedy films
Films directed by William Clemens
American black-and-white films
1940s English-language films
1940s American films